2Cellos is the self-titled debut studio album by Croatian cello duo, 2Cellos. It was released on June 10, 2011, worldwide, through Sony Masterworks.  The album peaked at number 1 on the US Billboard Top Classical Albums chart.

Critical reception 

Chad Grischow of IGN Music called the duo's Nirvana cover "astonishing" and the U2 covers "nothing short of magical." However, he was unimpressed by "The Resistance," and wrote that "'Viva La Vida' is too obvious a choice" for their debut album.

Ultimate-Guitar.com, commented on the album's choice of songs as "eclectic ... but the cellists handle a good number of genres easily." The site attributed the album's quality to the fact that the "duo's approach to the majority of the songs is more about texture or a percussive quality ... against flashy, over-the-top tracks."

Allmusic's review noted that the cellists "have created an inventive first offering, with unique and innovative arrangements, that deserves to transcend their YouTube beginnings" 
and praises their musical talents "which seem to produce sounds from a cello that otherwise wouldn't seem possible."

Track listing

Charts 

Album

Singles

Year-end charts

Music videos

Release history

Accolades

References

External links
2Cellos on iTunes

2011 debut albums
2Cellos albums
Covers albums